Pescado 2, also known as Pescado Rabioso 2, is the second studio album by Argentine rock band Pescado Rabioso, released in 1973 on Talent-Microfón. It was recorded between November 1972 and February 1973 at Estudios Phonalex in Buenos Aires, shortly before the group's disbandment. Pescado 2 was released as a double album, consisting of two LP records titled Pescado and 2 (dos); and was intended to be listened as a whole, hence the tracks being listed from one to eighteenth. The first edition included a booklet with lyrics, photographs and drawings by Spinetta and his brother Gustavo.

The album is considered a classic of Argentine rock. In 2007, the Argentine edition of Rolling Stone ranked it nineteenth on its list of The 100 Greatest Albums of Argentine Rock.

American rapper Eminem sampled "Peteribí" in the song "Stepdad", off his 2020 album Music to Be Murdered By.

Track listing

Personnel
Credits adapted from the liner notes of Pescado 2, except where otherwise noted.

Luis Alberto Spinetta – guitar, vocals, cover art
David Lebón – bass, vocals, guitar
Carlos Cutaia – organ, piano
Black Amaya – drums, percussion
Gustavo Spinetta – cover art
Norberto Orliac – audio engineer
Oscar López – recording coordination
Viviana Rossi – back cover, photography

See also

1973 in Argentina
1973 in music
Cultural impact of the Beatles
Music of Argentina
Origins of Argentine rock
Psychedelic era
Psychedelic rock in Latin America

References

External links
 
  statistics, tagging and previews at Last.fm
 Pescado 2 at Rate Your Music

1973 albums
Pescado Rabioso albums
Spanish-language albums